Michel Baud (11 November 1963 – 13 September 2012) was a French Egyptologist, head of the Nubian Sudan section in the Department of Egyptian Antiquities of the Louvre Museum. As such, he was the organizer of an exhibition devoted exclusively to Meroe, Sudan's ancient kingdom known for its legendary capital city and its famous royal necropolis. He was also the director of the archaeological mission on the site of the necropolis at Abu Rawash, and published papers on it such as La ceramique miniature d'Abou Rawash. 
 He was a resident of the French Institute of Oriental Archaeology in Cairo. He was also the author of works on the late Old Kingdom South Saqqara Stone annal document with Vassil Dobrev, published between 1995 and 1997 in BIFAO.

Baud died on 13 September 2012 at the age of 48.

Major publications
Djéser et la IIIe dynastie : Imhotep, Saqqara, Memphis, les pyramides à degrés, Paris, Pygmalion, coll. « Les Grands Pharaons », 2007, 302 p.
Famille royale et pouvoir sous l'Ancien Empire égyptien. Tome 1 & 2, Institut français d'archéologie orientale (1999), Bibliothèque d'étude 126, available online
De nouvelles annales de l'Ancien Empire Egyptien. Une "Pierre de Palerme" pour la VIe dynastie, Bulletin de l'Institut Francais d'Archeologie Orientale 95, pp. 23–92, available online
Méroé, un empire sur le Nil, Officina Libraria, 2010

References

French Egyptologists
French archaeologists
People associated with the Louvre
History of Nubia
2012 deaths
1963 births
People from Tarbes
Members of the Institut Français d'Archéologie Orientale